Frank Film is a 1973 American animated short film by Frank Mouris. The film won an Academy Award for Best Animated Short Film and was inducted into the National Film Registry in 1996.

Summary
It is a compilation of images co-creator Frank Mouris had collected from magazines interwoven with two narrations, one giving a mostly linear autobiography and the other stating words having to do with the images, the story the first voice is relating, or neither. Frank made the film with Caroline Mouris.
The soundtrack was conceived and created by  Tony Schwartz.

Reception
The movie won the 1974 Academy Award for Best Short Subject, Animated Films and the Annecy Cristal at the Annecy International Animated Film Festival alongside praise by film critic Andrew Sarris as the best American film at the New York Film Festival and "a nine minute evocation of America's exhilarating everythingness". Vulture ranked the film #82 on their list of Oscar-winning animated shorts.

Legacy
In 1996, Frank Film was selected for the United States National Film Registry by the Library of Congress as being "culturally, historically, or aesthetically significant". The film was also featured in the 1985 movie titled Explorers. The film was preserved by the Academy Film Archive in 2019.

Frank Film is included on the 2007 DVD five by two: five animated shorts by frank & caroline mouris. It was also included in the Animation Show of Shows.

See also
 List of American films of 1973
 Cutout animation
 Collage film

Notes

References
 Olivier Cotte (2007) Secrets of Oscar-winning animation: Behind the scenes of 13 classic short animations. (Making of Frank Film) Focal Press.

External links
 
 Internet Archive
 Excerpt
 Film'' essay by Daniel Eagan in America's Film Legacy: The Authoritative Guide to the Landmark Movies in the National Film Registry, A&C Black, 2010 , pages 691-691

1973 films
1973 animated films
1970s American animated films
1970s animated short films
Collage film
American avant-garde and experimental films
American animated short films
Best Animated Short Academy Award winners
United States National Film Registry films
Cutout animation films
1970s English-language films
1973 independent films